Stanley is a city in Mountrail County, North Dakota, United States. It is the county seat of Mountrail County. The population was 2,579 at the 2020 census, making it the 20th largest city in North Dakota. Stanley was founded in 1902. The town's economy is heavily connected to the nearby oil-rich Bakken Formation.

History
Stanley was platted in 1902. The Mountrail County Courthouse was built in 1914.

Geography

Stanley is located at  (48.314716, −102.388410).

Transportation

Rail
Amtrak, the national passenger rail system, serves a station in Stanley via its Empire Builder, a once-daily train in each direction between Portland, Oregon/Seattle, Washington and Chicago. The Great Northern Railway Underpass is now on the National Register of Historic Places.

Economy

Oil
Stanley is situated on the Bakken Formation, which encompasses northwestern North Dakota, northeastern Montana, and southern Saskatchewan, Canada. The formation is a rich source of oil, first discovered in the 1950s. Until the late 2000s the cost of oil extraction was too high to retrieve the oil profitably. With new technologies in oilfield production and the rising price of oil, the field has now become economically viable.

Demographics

2010 census
As of the census of 2010, there were 1,458 people, 629 households, and 362 families living in the city. The racial makeup of the city was 97.4% White, 0.2% African American, 0.5% Native American, 0.5% Asian, 0.6% from other races, and 0.8% from two or more races. Hispanic or Latino of any race were 3.9% of the population.

There were 629 households, of which 24.0% had children under the age of 18 living with them, 47.5% were married couples living together, 5.7% had a female householder with no husband present, 4.3% had a male householder with no wife present, and 42.4% were non-families. 35.8% of all households were made up of individuals, and 16.5% had someone living alone who was 65 years of age or older. The average household size was 2.21 and the average family size was 2.89.

The median age in the city was 44.1 years. 21% of residents were under the age of 18; 6.5% were between the ages of 18 and 24; 23.2% were from 25 to 44; 26.5% were from 45 to 64; and 22.9% were 65 years of age or older. The gender makeup of the city was 50.2% male and 49.8% female.

2000 census
As of the census of 2000, there were 1,279 people, 576 households, and 332 families living in the city. The population density was 740.3 people per square mile (285.4/km). There were 664 housing units at an average density of 384.3 per square mile (148.2/km). The racial makeup of the city was 98.98% White, 0.55% Native American, 0.31% Asian, 0.08% Pacific Islander, and 0.08% from two or more races. Hispanic or Latino of any race were 0.55% of the population.

There were 576 households, out of which 24.0% had children under the age of 18 living with them, 48.1% were married couples living together, 6.8% had a female householder with no husband present, and 42.2% were non-families. 39.8% of all households were made up of individuals, and 24.0% had someone living alone who was 65 years of age or older. The average household size was 2.12 and the average family size was 2.84.

In the city, the population was spread out, with 22.3% under the age of 18, 5.9% from 18 to 24, 18.8% from 25 to 44, 22.8% from 45 to 64, and 30.3% who were 65 years of age or older. The median age was 47 years. For every 100 females, there were 86.2 males. For every 100 females age 18 and over, there were 82.7 males.

The median income for a household in the city was $23,993, and the median income for a family was $35,074. Males had a median income of $26,250 versus $17,813 for females. The per capita income for the city was $15,349. About 5.7% of families and 10.7% of the population were below the poverty line, including 12.6% of those under age 18 and 14.3% of those age 65 or over.

Notable people

 Ann Nicole Nelson, a victim of the September 11, 2001 attacks
 Lee Harvey Oswald allegedly lived in Stanley for a short time in 1953, though this claim has been thoroughly debunked

Climate
This climatic region is typified by large seasonal temperature differences, with warm to hot (and often humid) summers and cold (sometimes severely cold) winters.  According to the Köppen Climate Classification system, Stanley has a humid continental climate, abbreviated "Dfb" on climate maps.

References

External links
 City Data site

Cities in Mountrail County, North Dakota
Cities in North Dakota
County seats in North Dakota
Populated places established in 1902
1902 establishments in North Dakota